University Centre Weston, also known as UCW, is a university centre based in the town of Weston-super-Mare, Somerset, England. The centre was formed by Weston College in 2016 following the college's announcement of university centre status with UWE Bristol and Bath Spa University in November 2015.

UCW is currently based at Weston College's Knightstone Campus, with some degree level provision based at its South West Skills and University Campuses.

History
Weston College has delivered higher education courses since 1993. Under the leadership of Dr Paul Phillips, who became its principal in 2001, the college expanded its degree-level provision and gained university centre status first with Bath Spa University in May 2014.

In November 2015, at Weston College's annual business breakfast, Dr Phillips announced that the college would further expand its university-level provision through university centre status with UWE Bristol. This partnership was further developed with the announcement of the creation of an Institute of Professional Education in July 2016.

UCW's new logo was debuted on the hoarding surrounding the seafront portion of Weston-super-Mare's Winter Gardens Pavilion, part of which will house the organisation when it is reopened in 2017.

The university centre scored 88% in the National Student Survey's 'overall satisfaction' survey, above the national average of 86%.

Campuses

UCW is primarily based in Weston College's Knightstone Campus, with floors five and six dedicated to the college's degree courses. Expansion of the higher education provision resulted in the creation of the University Campus in 2007 and the Future Technology Centre, from which UCW teaches its university-level engineering courses.

The university centre's logo was debuted on the hoarding surrounding the Winter Gardens Pavilion in 2016.

Courses
University Centre Weston runs 34 courses at levels 5 and 6 of the UK's National Qualifications Framework. It is the only educational establishment in North Somerset that provides higher level qualifications in engineering.

UCW has courses in the following subjects: animal management, art, business, care and early years, computing, counselling, engineering, film and media, games and animation, graphic design, music, performing arts, public and environmental health, sport, teaching, and uniformed and public services.

Assessment

In 2016, nearly a quarter of UCW's Honours Degree students, and 47% of its applied computing students, achieved First Class Honours.

Awards
 2017 - Teaching Excellence Framework 'Gold'
 2016 - Quality Assurance Agency for Higher Education 'Quality Mark' for higher education.

References

Weston-super-Mare
Higher education colleges in England
Education in North Somerset